Osceola in Grant County, Wisconsin was an extensive city platted by James P. Cox in April of 1839 in part of the area which would eventually become Potosi. The elaborate project covering several square miles failed to attract support, although in 1838 a ferry landing was established at Osceola, and Cox and his partner Justus Parsons were granted authority to run a ferry to cross the Grant River and then the Mississippi River to a place called Parsons Landing in what would soon be declared Iowa Territory, which ferry would run for some years to come.

The abortive "City of Osceola" in 1841 became part of the new Village of Potosi.

References 

Ghost towns in Grant County, Wisconsin